Byron Allen Folks (born April 22, 1961) is an American businessman, television producer, and comedian. He is the founder of the U.S. media company Entertainment Studios, which has interests in television production, broadcasting, film production, and digital media.

Born in Detroit and later moving to Los Angeles, he initially pursued a career in stand-up comedy. After an appearance on The Tonight Show, Allen began to expand into television work, including becoming a host for NBC's Real People. In 1993, Allen established what would later become known as Entertainment Studios.

Early life and education
Allen was born in Detroit, grew up there until 1968 when he moved with his mother after her divorce to Los Angeles. His interest in show business began during his childhood when he accompanied his mother, Carolyn Folks, to NBC Studios in Burbank (where she worked as a publicist).

At age 14, Allen put together his first stand-up routine, and began appearing on amateur night at comedy clubs throughout the Los Angeles area. Allen attended high school at Fairfax High School in Los Angeles and college at the University of Southern California.

Professional career
Comedian Jimmie Walker saw Allen's stand-up act and invited the 14-year-old comedian to join his comedy writing team alongside promising young comedians Jay Leno and David Letterman. In 1979 at the age of 18, Allen made his television debut on The Tonight Show Starring Johnny Carson, becoming the youngest comedian to ever perform on the show; he used the appearance to learn more about the television industry. 

Following his appearance on The Tonight Show, NBC cast Allen as a reporter for its series Real People—his first role on a network prime time program. Allen co-wrote and co-starred in the 1988 CBS television film Case Closed, hosted the syndicated late-night talk show The Byron Allen Show from 1989 to 1992, and toured as an opening act for musicians such as Dolly Parton, Gladys Knight, Lionel Richie, and The Pointer Sisters.

In 1993, Allen established a production company known as CF Entertainment, which would be devoted to producing low-cost non-fiction television programming; its first program would be the syndicated talk show Entertainers with Byron Allen, which featured interviews between Allen and celebrities. The interviews were filmed at hotel press junkets for upcoming films, allowing him to produce the show at a relatively low cost by leveraging the equipment set up by the studio. Allen distributed the program under a bartered model, in which it would be offered to stations at no cost, with revenue sharing on advertising sales. The business model was not initially successful, resulting in Allen's home facing multiple foreclosures, and at one point losing telephone service—requiring him to conduct business via a payphone.

The company was renamed Entertainment Studios in 2003. In 2012, Allen began forays into scripted programming with the sitcoms The First Family and Mr. Box Office. Later in the decade, Entertainment Studios began to pursue various acquisitions, including film distributor Freestyle Releasing, TheGrio, The Weather Channel, an equity stake in Sinclair Broadcast Group's acquisition of the Fox Sports Networks, and broadcast television stations. By October 2022, the company was valued at over $4.5 billion.

In February 2022, Allen made a bid to buy the Denver Broncos of the National Football League. Allen was ultimately outbid by a group led by S. Robson Walton.

Awards 
In 2018, Allen was selected for the Bloomberg 50 as one of "the people in business, entertainment, finance, politics, technology and science whose 2018 accomplishments were particularly noteworthy".

He was also selected for the 100 Most Intriguing Entrepreneurs at the Goldman Sachs Builders & Innovators Summit 2018, and he was honored by The Salvation Army and the Los Angeles Metropolitan advisory board at the Salvation Army's 11th annual Christmas Kettle luncheon.

In January 2019, Allen was a recipient of National Association of Television Program Executives's 16th Annual Brandon Tartikoff Legacy Awards, presented during the annual NATPE Miami Marketplace & Conference. Allen received the 2019 Whitney Young Award at the 46th annual Los Angeles Urban League Awards dinner.

In February 2023, the African American Student Union of the Harvard Business School presented Allen with its inaugural "Legendary Honor".

Personal life
Allen married TV producer Jennifer Lucas in 2007. The couple has three children. Allen is on the Motion Picture & Television Fund Board of Governors.

Allen has residences in Aspen, Maui, Los Angeles, and New York City. In 2022, he bought a two-home compound in Beverly Hills, California from Jeffrey Skoll for $22 million, and a mansion in Malibu, California, previously owned by Tamara Gustavson for $100 million. The latter was reported to be the most expensive U.S. home purchase ever made by an African American.

References

External links

Entertainment Studios

1961 births
20th-century American comedians
21st-century American businesspeople
African-American businesspeople
African-American television personalities
American chief executives in the media industry
American stand-up comedians
Television producers from Michigan
American television talk show hosts
African-American television talk show hosts
Businesspeople from Detroit
Businesspeople from Los Angeles
Comedians from Los Angeles County
Comedians from Michigan
Entertainment Studios
Living people
20th-century African-American people
21st-century African-American people